Jane Gray (born 1931) is a British stained glass artist. She trained at the Kingston  School of Arts from 1949 to 1951, where she specialised in weaving and stained glass, and then studied at the Royal College of Art until 1955. She worked as an assistant to Lawrence Lee during this time on the nave windows of Coventry Cathedral.

She has worked on more than a hundred windows in at least 40 churches, including St Peter, Martindale (1974), Shrewsbury Abbey, St Oswald, Oswestry and St Mary, Chirk. She suffered a stroke in 1996, but was able to continue working, two windows at St Nicholas, Blakeney from 2000 being late examples of her windows. Since 1992 she has lived near Shrawardine, where she has had a workshop, in Shropshire.

References

External links

British stained glass artists and manufacturers
1931 births
Living people